The 1939 Orange Bowl was a postseason American college football bowl game, held in Miami, Florida, on January 2, 1939.

The game between the Tennessee and the Oklahoma Sooners concluded the 1938 college football season. It was the fifth edition of the Orange Bowl and took place at the Orange Bowl stadium, then known as Roddey Burdine Stadium. Both teams entered the game undefeated and untied; Tennessee was a slight favorite, and shut out the Sooners, 17–0.

The head coaches were Tom Stidham of Oklahoma and Bob Neyland of Tennessee.

References

Orange Bowl
Orange Bowl
Oklahoma Sooners football bowl games
Tennessee Volunteers football bowl games
Orange Bowl
Orange Bowl